Isabella of Aragon (1305 – 12 July 1330) was the daughter of James II of Aragon and his second wife Blanche of Anjou. The queen consort of Frederick I of Austria, she was a member of the House of Barcelona.

Life
Isabella was originally betrothed to Oshin, King of Armenia, son of Leo II, King of Armenia and his wife Queen Keran. Her father planned her betrothal to Oshin of Armenia in exchange for religious relics of St Thecla, located at Sis in Armenia, which he was anxious to acquire for the cathedral of Tarragona.  Negotiations for the marriage broke down in the face of Armenian opposition to increased close ties with the Catholic western powers.

On 11 May 1315, Isabella married Frederick I of Austria, King of Germany in Ravensburg. From then onwards, Isabella was known as Elisabeth in Germany and Austria. Her husband had been elected as one of two rival Kings of Germany in October, 1314. His rival was Louis IV of Bavaria. With her marriage, Isabel became one of two Queens of Germany with Beatrix von Silesia-Glogau, wife of Louis IV. On 5 September 1325, Frederick I and Louis IV resolved their conflict by agreeing to serve as co-rulers. However Frederick soon became the junior co-ruler and retired to Austria until his death on 13 January 1330.

It is said that Isabella was blind in the last six years of her life. She was buried in Vienna.

Marriage and issue
Isabel and Frederick had at least three children:

Frederick of Austria (1316–1322).
Elisabeth of Austria (1317 – 23 October 1336).
Anna of Austria (1318 – 14 December 1343). Married first Henry XV, Duke of Bavaria and secondly John Henry, Count of Gorizia.

References

Sources
111

1305 births
1330 deaths
14th-century House of Habsburg
German queens consort
Austrian royal consorts
Aragonese infantas
14th-century German women
14th-century German nobility
14th-century Austrian women
Daughters of kings
Burials in Vienna